The Dresden tramway network is a network of tramways forming the backbone of the public transport system in Dresden, a city in the federal state of Saxony, Germany.  Opened in 1872, it has been operated since 1993 by Dresdner Verkehrsbetriebe (DVB), and is integrated in the Verkehrsverbund Oberelbe (VVO).

History
The origins of the Dresden tramway network can be traced back to the year 1872, when the first horse-drawn line opened between the city centre and the former village of Blasewitz, now a borough of Dresden.

Lines

The Dresden tramway network is a mixed system of traditional street running, especially in the inner city boroughs close to the city centre, and modern light rail. This is sometimes called the Dresden Gauge

In recent years, street running has been replaced by independent right-of-way arrangements wherever possible, and new extensions created in the same form. In November 2008, a  extension of line 7 was opened from Gorbitz to Pennrich, in Dresden's south eastern suburbs. In July 2019, routes 9 and 13 were realigned along a  section to provide better connections with regional trains at Dresden-Strehlen station.

Unlike many other German cities of comparable size, no stadtbahn style tunnel sections or high platform stops have been created. Many tram stops have been rebuilt so as to be fully accessible to physically disabled persons, and to allow level boarding to the low floor trams that now operate most services.

Different lines can be identified by a line number and a colour code.  the lines are:

Future plans, as part of the Stadtbahnprogramm 2020, include  of new tram line, with work starting in 2014. Some  would be on reserved track, and the new lines would replace bus lines 61 and 62, some of the city's busiest, with an estimated cost of 223 million euros. The new lines comprise:

 Prager Str to Plauen Bhf via Budapester Str and Chemnitzer Str
 Großer Garten to Löbtau via Technische Universität
 City Center to Fetscherplatz via Pillnitzer Str and Striesener Str
 Sachsenallee to Max-Planck-Institute via Johannstadt
 Bühlau to Weißig

On all tram lines except lines 4 and 11, a general 10-minute headway is offered on weekdays, extending to 15 minutes on Saturday, Sunday and in the evening. On the main routes through the inner city, where different lines intertwine, vehicles run up to every two minutes. Line 4, which extends a considerable distance beyond the city boundary to the towns of Radebeul, Coswig and Weinböhla, operates the standard 10 or 15 minute interval service as far as Radebeul West, and a 30-minute service beyond that to Coswig and Weinböhla. Line 11 is running every 7 to 8 minutes during peak hours.

Rolling stock

, Dresden's tram fleet was made up of 166 modern tramsets (with 31 older trams).  Most of the trams operating in Dresden are articulated low floor cars, of two different basic designs, each of which has several variants.

The first generation of low floor cars was built by Deutsche Waggonbau in Bautzen between 1995 and 2002; both 6 and 8 axle variants exist. The second generation of low floor cars have been built since 2003 are Bombardier Flexity Classics, both 8 and 12 axle variants exist.

The fleet used to be composed of ČKD Tatra trams that provided service towards the end of the GDR era. At present some Tatra T4 cars built between 1968 and 1984 are still in service, but it is intended that they will all be replaced by 2010.

The DVB tram fleet operates out of three depots; at Gorbitz on routes 2,6 and 7 in south west Dresden, at Trachenberge on route 3 in the north-west, and Reick on routes 1, 9 and 13 in the south-east. Gorbitz is new facility opened in 1996 and includes a new central workshops. Trachenberge and Reick are older facilities that have both been heavily rebuilt to similar standards, whilst several other older depots have been closed. The former central workshops at Trachenberge, adjacent to the current depot, now house the Dresden Tram Museum, which has a collection including examples of many former Dresden trams.

CarGoTram

The CarGoTram is a freight carrying tram that supplies Volkswagen's Transparent Factory, crossing the city. The connection by tram was established to reduce the number of trucks used. The factory is located to the east of the city centre, next to the Großer Garten, whilst the distribution depot that loads the parts is to the west of the city centre.

See also

List of town tramway systems in Germany
Trams in Germany

References

Notes

Bibliography

External links

Dresdner Verkehrsbetriebe – official site 
 
 

Dresden
Transport in Dresden
600 V DC railway electrification
Dresden